Francis de Erdely (Hungarian: Erdélyi Ferenc) (May 3, 1904 – November 28, 1959) was a Hungarian-American artist who was renowned in Europe and the United States for his powerful figure paintings and drawings as well as for his teaching abilities.

Biography
Francis De Erdely was born in Budapest, Hungary in 1904. De Erdely first studied at the Royal Academy of Arts in Budapest (1919–1924), as well as the Real Academia de Bellas Artes de San Fernando (Royal Academy of Fine Arts of San Fernando) in Madrid and the prestigious Sorbonne and Ecole du Louvre in Paris.

De Erdely's technical abilities, brushwork, and composition were based in European classicism. Politics began to inform his work when Fascism began to gain ground in Europe. As De Erdely's career developed, he became less focused on history painting and the themes of classical Antiquity. Subjects surrounding war, suffering, and human strength became present.

De Erdely immigrated to the United States in 1939. Living in New York and Chicago initially, he was hired to paint portrait of wealthy patrons. He also painted images of the American Scene. It was after his move to Los Angeles, when his mature work developed and he established himself as an American artist.

He is best known for his figure-based paintings done in Los Angeles during the 1940s and 1950s of immigrants, laborers, dancers, and social outsiders. It has been argued that this period of his work relate directly to De Erdely's own experience as an immigrant in a new country.

Collections
 Brussels Moderne, Brussels, Belgium
 Royal Museum of Fine Arts Antwerp, Antwerp, Belgium
 Butler Institute of American Art, Youngstown, Ohio, United States
 Colorado Springs Fine Arts, Colorado Springs, Colorado, United States
 Corcoran Gallery of Art, Washington, D.C., United States
 De Young Memorial Museum, San Francisco, California, United States
 Denver Art Museum, Denver, Colorado, United States
 Detroit Institute of Arts, Detroit, Michigan, United States
 Fine Arts Museums of San Francisco, California, United States
 Los Angeles County Museum of Art, Los Angeles, California, United States
 Metropolitan Museum of Art, New York, New York, United States
 National Gallery of Victoria, Melbourne, Victoria, Australia
 Nora Eccles Harrison Museum of Art, Utah State University, Utah, United States
 Oakland Museum of Art, Oakland, California, United States
 Pasadena Art Institute, Pasadena, California, United States
 Pennsylvania Academy of the Fine Arts, Philadelphia, Pennsylvania, United States
 Seattle Museum of Art, Seattle, Washington, United States
 Springville Museum of Art, Springville, Utah, United States
 USC Fisher Gallery, California, United States
Laguna Art Museum, Laguna, California, United States

Exhibitions
 1925: Budapest, Hungary
 1939: Hungarian Relief Library, New York, New York, United States
 1940–1944: Detroit Institute of Arts, Detroit, Michigan, United States
 1940: De Young Memorial Museum, San Francisco, California, United States
 1940: Santa Barbara Museum of Art, Santa Barbara, California, United States
 1941: Pennsylvania Academy of the Fine Arts, Philadelphia, Pennsylvania, United States
 1942: Vancouver Museum of Fine Art
 1942–1945: Art Institute of Chicago, Chicago, Illinois, United States
 1942–1943: The Scarab Club, Detroit, Michigan, United States
 1943: Corcoran Gallery of Art, Washington, D.C., United States
 1943–1944: De Young Memorial Museum, San Francisco, California, United States
 1945–1946: Denver Art Museum, Denver, Colorado, United States
 1945–1946: San Francisco Fine Arts Association, California, United States
 1946: Pasadena School of Arts, Pasadena, California, United States
 1950: Laguna Beach Art Gallery, Laguna Beach, California, United States
 1950: Crocker, Sacramento, California, United States
 1950: Haggin Museum, Stockton, California, United States
 1950: Oakland Art Museum, Oakland, California, United States
 1959–1960: Pasadena Art Museum, Pasadena, California, United States
 1960: Seattle Art Museum, Seattle, Washington, United States
 1960: Los Angeles County Museum of Art, Los Angeles, California, United States
 2022: Laguna Art Museum, Laguna Beach, California, United States

Awards
 1925 – Szinyei-Merse Grand Prize, Budapest, Hungary
 1929 – Triennial Bronze Medal, Ghent, Belgium 
 1940–1944 – Detroit Art Institute (prizes)
 1942 – Scarab Club, Detroit, Michigan (medal)
 1943 – Scarab Club, Detroit, Michigan (medal)
 1946 – Scarab Club, Detroit, Michigan (prize)
 1946 – Pasadena School of Arts (prize)
 1947–1951 – Oakland Art Gallery (prizes)
 1949 – Arizona State Fair (award)
 1954 – Audubon Association (medal)

References

Further reading

External links

Francis de Erdely papers, 1925-1968, Archives of American Art, Smithsonian Institution

1904 births
1959 deaths
Hungarian painters
Hungarian sculptors
20th-century American painters
American male painters
Modern painters
Modern sculptors
University of Paris alumni
University of Southern California faculty
Erdelyi Ferenc
Hungarian emigrants to the United States
Artists from Budapest
Burials at Forest Lawn Memorial Park (Glendale)
20th-century American sculptors
American male sculptors
Hungarian expatriates in France
Hungarian expatriates in Spain
20th-century American male artists